Kassite deities were the pantheon of the Kassites (Akkadian: Kaššû, from Kassite Galzu), a group inhabiting parts of modern Iraq (mostly historical Babylonia and the Nuzi area), as well as Iran and Syria, in the second and first millennia BCE. A dynasty of Kassite origin ruled Babylonia starting with the fifteenth century BCE. Kassites spoke the Kassite language, known from references in Mesopotamian sources. Many of the known Kassite words are names of Kassite deities. Around twenty have been identified so far. The evidence of their cult is limited, and only two of them, Šuqamuna and Šumaliya, are known to have had a temple. Other well attested Kassite deities include the presumed head god Ḫarbe, the weather god Buriaš, the sun god Saḫ and the deified mountain Kamulla.

Overview

Around two dozen of names Kassite deities have been identified in texts written in the Kassite language, a language isolate only known from references in Mesopotamian lexical texts and from personal names. Detailed study is not possible due to lack of any sources preserving its grammar and syntax. 

Much of the evidence of Kassite culture pertains to the Kassite dynasty of Babylon. Those kings adopted both the languages (Sumerian and Akkadian) and religion of the Babylonians, and were actively involved in maintaining temples of Mesopotamian deities, for example Eanna in Uruk. For this reason, Nathanael Shelley notes it would be more accurate to refer to it as a dynasty whose members had Kassite names, rather than a strictly Kassite dynasty. Starting with Kadašman-Enlil I, some of them started to include the names of Mesopotamian gods in their names, though only after the invasion of Assyrian king Tukulti-Ninurta I examples include deities other than Enlil, such as Marduk, Adad or Zababa. They also attributed their royal legitimacy from Mesopotamian Enlil, rather than from a Kassite deity. There is no evidence that the Kassite dynasty built any temples of Kassite gods in Babylonia, with the exception of one dedicated to the dynastic tutelary deities Šuqamuna and Šumaliya in Babylon. Despite their role, these two deities do not appear in the names of any of its members. 

The archives from Nuzi in northeastern Mesopotamia are considered to be a valuable resource in the study of Kassite onomastics, even though only two percent of the city's inhabitants bore Kassite names, and there is no indication that they had any larger impact on the culture of its other inhabitants. 

The ordinary Kassites living in Babylonia came to be gradually assimilated, and by the first millennium BCE only around fifteen percent of them bore Kassite names. Some of the names invoked Mesopotamian, rather than Kassite, deities: Adad, Enlil, Ištar of Agade, Ištaran (dKA.DI), Laguda, Marduk and Urash. Babylonian and Assyrian rulers most likely tolerated the worship of Kassite deities, and some of them are still attested in sources from Mesopotamia from the first millennium BCE. It is possible that their role was limited to domestic religion, where they may have played the role of a marker of distinct Kassite identity. However, they are entirely absent from non-royal personal votive inscriptions. 

Most Kassite deities are only attested in personal names. It is often difficult to tell which elements of them should be interpreted as names of deities, and which are actually linguistically Kassite (rather than just not recognizably Babylonian). Furthermore, some of the words identified as names of individual deities might also be epithets. While it has been argued in the past that all the names of early Kassite rulers were theophoric, this theory is now regarded as implausible. An example of a most likely non-theophoric name is that of Kurigalzu, which means "shepherd of the Kassites." The name Karaindaš is also assumed to not be theophoric.

With the exception of Šuqamuna and Šumaliya, names of Kassite deities were always written without the dingir sign, so-called "divine determinative," which was used to designate names gods in Mesopotamian texts. Sporadic exceptions from this rule involving the names of Maruttaš and Kamulla are known, and in a single instance Buriaš is preceded by the dingir sign in a god list: dbur-ia-aš, explained as dIŠKUR kaš-šu-u2, "the Kassite weather god." Occasional references in literature to a singular instance of Saḫ written with a dingir in a personal name, Kadašman-Saḫ, are the result of an erroneous restoration. With the exception of Ḫarbe, Šuqamuna and Šumaliya, no Kassite deities have known iconography.

Lexical lists at times attest equivalencies between Mesopotamian and Kassite deities. Most of those texts likely postdate the Kassite period. It is possible that in some cases Kassite deities mentioned in them were assimilated into Mesopotamian ones, and lost their uniquely Kassite traits.

A few kings from later periods had Kassite theoporic names. The founder of the Second Sealand dynasty bore the name Simbar-Šiḫu (or Simbar-Šipak), invoking the Kassite deity Ši-ḪU, though inscriptions pertaining to his reign only mention his involvement in the worship of Enlil and Shamash, and it is possible that he saw himself as a successor of the First Sealand dynasty, rather than the Kassite one, as chronicles call him a "soldier of the dynasty of Damiq-ilīšu". The last king of the so-called Bazi dynasty, which might have had Kassite origin, bore a theophoric name invoking Šuqamuna, Širikti-Šuqamuna. He reigned for only three months in 985 BCE, no inscriptions attributed to him survive, and it is assumed he was a brother of the previous king, Ninurta-kudurri-usur I.

Disproved theories
In nineteenth and twentieth century scholarship, attempts were made to prove that some of the Kassite deities, namely Buriaš, Maruttaš and Šuriaš (argued to be cognates of Greek Boreas and Vedic Maruts and Surya, respectively), were derivatives of Indo-European deities. Such theories, formulated for example by Georges Dumézil, were labeled as far-fetched as early as in 1954. As noted by John A. Brinkman, the similarities between names "even if accepted, need not to imply more than temporary and perhaps mediate contact between the various groups or their cultural forebears." Furthermore, possible Kassite etymologies have been proposed for the names Buriaš and Šuriaš, while proposed Vedic connections of Maruttaš are no longer accepted in modern scholarship.

List of Kassite deities

Gods of Kassite origin in other religions of ancient Near East

Mesopotamia

Šuqamuna and Šumaliya were incorporated into the Mesopotamian pantheon. While they could be listed alongside Mesopotamian deities in inscriptions on kudrru, they usually appear in the end of such enumerations of gods, indicating their status in Mesopotamian theology was not high. It has also been proposed the deities on the facade of Eanna, added during the reign of Karaindaš, represent the tutelary deities of his family. 

A god named Kaššû (dkaš-šu-ú), "the Kassite," appears in Babylonian theophoric names, though only after the Kassite period, according to Grant Frame exclusively between the years 1008 and 955 BCE. The last king of the Second Sealand dynasty bore the theophoric name Kaššu-nādin-aḫi, while a certain Kaššu-bēl-zēri, known from an inscription concerned with an offering to the goddess Uṣur-amāssu, was a governor of the Sealand province of Babylonia at some point in the late eleventh or first half of the tenth century BCE. It has been proposed that Kaššu was derived from Šuqamuna, or that he represented a stereotype of Kassite identity in Babylonian culture. A goddess with a similar name, Kaššītu (dkaš-ši-tu, "the Kassite") appears in sources from the first millennium BCE, and might have developed from Šumaliya, though it has also been proposed that she represented a complete innovation, as other goddesses personifying population groups are attested for the first time from the same period, namely Aḫlamayītu ("the Aramean") and Sutītu ("the Sutean"). Kaššītu was worshiped in Babylon in the temple of Belet Ninua ("Lady of Nineveh"). She is also mentioned among deities Sennacherib carried off from Uruk, but she is absent from offering lists from the city's archive, attached to the Eanna temple.

Ugarit
According to Dennis Pardee, in the Ugaritic text RS 24.246, a list of hypostases of Ugaritic deities, there is a reference to the "Kassite moon" or "Kassite Yarikh," Yrḫ Kṯy, presumably a deity of Kassite origin. Yrḫ Kṯy is also mentioned in the texts RS 1.001, an offering list according to which he received a cow, and RS 24.271, a prayer for well-being.

Additionally, it has been proposed that Šuqamuna and Šumaliya correspond to the Ugaritic deities Ṯkmn and Šnm (Ṯukamuna-wa-Šunama), known from the text KTU 1.114 (RS 24.258), in which they carry the head god El after he got drunk. On the basis of this theory, Dennis Pardee proposed that "Ṯukmuna" was a deity with a Semitic name, adopted into the Kassite pantheon. However, the supposed presence of Šuqamuna and Šumaliya in the Ugaritic texts is a controversial topic in scholarship, and the matter is unresolved.

Elam
A temple of Kamul (Kamulla) is known from an inscription of the Elamite king Shutruk-Nahhunte, according to which he renovated it. Ran Zadok proposes that its existence was the result of a marriage between a Kassite princess and an Elamite king.

Wilfred G. Lambert tentatively proposed a connection between Mirizir and the Elamite goddess Manziniri.

References

Bibliography

Mesopotamian deities
Kassites